Beef curry puff may refer to:

Curry beef turnover, Chinese pastry
Curry puff, Southeast Asian pastry